The Siemens S55 was a mobile phone which was introduced by Siemens in late 2002. At the time it was a high end phone and one of the first colour phones by Siemens, with a 256 colour screen, Bluetooth and infrared, and a competitor to the Ericsson T68.

It was superseded by phones with screens with more colours and pixels, such as 4096, then 65K colour screens.

The S55 had features unique at that time for a phone of its size, including:
 optional 640x480 pixel clip-on camera with flash
 MMS
 Internet surfing
 Java
 Bluetooth
 Games in colour
 Audio recording
 Advanced calendar
 GSM Tri-band 900/1800/1900 MHz

Notes and references

S55
Mobile phones with infrared transmitter